is a railway station in Yaizu, Shizuoka Prefecture, Japan, operated by Central Japan Railway Company (JR Tōkai).

Lines
Yaizu Station is served by the Tōkaidō Main Line, and is located 193.7 kilometers from the starting point of the line at Tokyo Station.

Station layout
The station has a single island platform serving Track 1 and Track 2, connected to the station building by a footbridge. The station building has automated ticket machines, TOICA automated turnstiles and a staffed ticket office.

Platforms

Adjacent stations

|-
!colspan=5|Central Japan Railway Company

History
Yaizu Station was opened on April 16, 1889 when the section of the Tōkaidō Main Line connecting Shizuoka with Hamamatsu was completed. Regularly scheduled freight service was discontinued in 1986.

Station numbering was introduced to the section of the Tōkaidō Line operated JR Central in March 2018; Yaizu Station was assigned station number CA20.

Passenger statistics
In fiscal 2017, the station was used by an average of 9,188 passengers daily (boarding passengers only).

Surrounding area
Yaizu City Hall

See also
 List of Railway Stations in Japan

References

Yoshikawa, Fumio. Tokaido-sen 130-nen no ayumi. Grand-Prix Publishing (2002) .

External links

  

Railway stations in Japan opened in 1889
Railway stations in Shizuoka Prefecture
Tōkaidō Main Line
Stations of Central Japan Railway Company
Yaizu, Shizuoka